The Sacred Heart Church is the name of a religious building affiliated to the Catholic Church that is located in the main street of the city of Koror in the island and state of the same name in Palau a country of Oceania to the west of the Pacific Ocean. Nearby is the Maris Stella School and the Etpison Museum.

The temple follows the Roman or Latin rite and depends on the Diocese of the Caroline Islands (Dioecesis Carolinensium) based in Weno in the Federated States of Micronesia and which was created as a sui juris mission in 1886 and was elevated to its current status in 1979 through the bull "Tametsi Ecclesiae" of the then Pope John Paul II.

The present structure has its antecedents in the old church of the Sacred Heart (Sagrado Corazón) founded in the time of the Spanish colonization in 1892. A new structure was constructed in 1935 and it took 8 years to finish, to the inauguration attended by local parishioners and Japanese authorities.

See also
 Roman Catholicism in Palau
 Sacred Heart Church (disambiguation)
 List of Jesuit sites

References

Roman Catholic churches in Palau
Buildings and structures in Koror
Roman Catholic churches completed in 1935
20th-century Roman Catholic church buildings